Udit is an Indian masculine given name that may refer to:

Udit Narayan, Bollywood playback singer 
Udit Narayan (politician) (born 1960), Fijian politician of Indian descent
Udit Narayan Singh (1770–1835), Indian monarch
Udit Patel (born 1984), Indian cricketer 
Udit Raj, Indian politician
Udit Birla (born 1989), Indian cricketer
Kunwar Udit Swaraj, Bollywood playback singer 

Indian masculine given names